Zola is a section of the Soweto township lying south of Johannesburg in Gauteng, South Africa. A number of well-known public figures, mostly musicians call Zola their home and were born and bred there.

Zola is in the west of Soweto and is also known as Mzambiya (Zambia) or Mashona (west side). It is surrounded by the townships of Tladi, Naledi, Dobsonville, Emndeni, Jabulani and Moletsane. The musicians Mongezi and his wife, the late Margaret Singana, stayed in Zola before they got a house in Jabulani location which is also near Zola. Mdu Masilela, Mandoza, Mshoza, Mzambiya, Brown Dash, Mapaputsi, and Zola were all born in Zola. Soccer legends like Shoes of Orlando Pirates, Ace Mnini of Moroka Swallows, and Ree Skhosana of Moroka Swallows were all from Zola. Brenda Fassie also lived in Zola in the early 1980s.

Zola is one of the most popular townships in Soweto and famous throughout South Africa for its notorious gangsters in the 1960s, 1970s and 1980s. Gangsters like 11 Boys in the 1960s, Maumaus in the 1970s, and Chivas and Big18s in the late 1980s/early 1990s. It is a popular tourist destination.

The Famous historical schools from Zola are Zola Higher Primary School, Dr. Vilakazi and Lavela Secondary School. An upcoming school is Kwadedangendlale Senior Secondary School with good pass rates.

References

Johannesburg Region D
Soweto Townships